Zizia aurea (golden alexanders, golden zizia) is a flowering herbaceous perennial plant of the carrot family Apiaceae. It is native to eastern Canada and the United States, from the eastern Great Plains to the Atlantic Coast. It is named for Johann Baptist Ziz, a German botanist.

Description

They are attached to the stems alternately. Each leaf is compound and odd-pinnate, with leaflets that are normally lanceolate or ovate with serrated edges. The root system consists of a dense cluster of coarse fibrous roots.

It blooms from May to June. Its flowers are yellow and grow in a flat-topped umbel at the top of the plant. In the fall both the leaves and the fruit turn purple.

Distribution and habitat
Golden Alexanders is native to the United States and Canada. It grows from New Brunswick to Saskatchewan, south to Florida and Texas, and west to Montana. It is found in a broad variety of habitats, such as moist black soil prairies, openings in moist to mesic woodlands, savannas, thickets, limestone glades and bluffs, power line clearings in woodland areas, abandoned fields, and wet meadows. It can tolerate dry summers even though it prefers wet habitats. It is hardy in USDA zones 4–9.

Ecology
It is a host plant for the caterpillars of the black swallowtail (Papilio polyxenes asterius) and Ozark swallowtail (Papilio joanae) butterflies. Females of the mining bee species Andrena ziziae are oligolectic on Zizia aurea—they eat only its pollen. Dozens of species of bees, flies, wasps, butterflies, and other insects visit the flowers of Zizia aurea for its nectar.

References

aurea
Flora of North America